The Chicken Ranch Rancheria of Me-Wuk Indians of California is a federally recognized tribe of Miwok people in Tuolumne County, California. The Chicken Ranch Rancheria Miwok are central Sierra Miwok, an indigenous people of California.

Government
The tribe conducts business from Jamestown, California. The tribe is led by an elected council.

Reservation
The Chicken Ranch Rancheria is 2.85-acre parcel of land, located in Tuolumne County.

Economic development
The tribe owns Chicken Ranch Casino, located in Jamestown, California as well as the Ranch House Restaurant.

Education
The ranchería is served by the Jamestown Elementary School District and Sonora Union High School District.

Notes

References
 Pritzker, Barry M. A Native American Encyclopedia: History, Culture, and Peoples. Oxford: Oxford University Press, 2000.

External links

Miwok
Native American tribes in California
Federally recognized tribes in the United States
Populated places in Tuolumne County, California
American Indian reservations in California
Tuolumne County, California